The Beyond the Sea Tag Team Championship is a professional wrestling tag team championship created and promoted by the Seadlinnng promotion. The inaugural champions were crowned on July 25, 2018, when Borderless (Rina Yamashita and Yoshiko) defeated Nanae Takahashi and Tsukasa Fujimoto.

Like most professional wrestling championships, the title is won as a result of a scripted match. There have been eleven reigns shared among ten teams and thirteen wrestlers. Asuka and Makoto are the current champions in their second reign as a team as well as individual.

Title history 
On July 25, 2018, Borderless (Rina Yamashita and Yoshiko) defeated Nanae Takahashi and Tsukasa Fujimoto to become the inaugural champions. On February 28, 2019, the current champions Arisa Nakajima and Ayame Sasamura vacated the title after Sasamura suffered a leg injury. On March 20, Nakajima alongside Sae defeated Himeka Arita and Miyuki Takase to win the vacant championship.

Reigns 
The inaugural championship team was Borderless (Rina Yamashita and Yoshiko). The team Las Fresa de Egoistas (Asuka and Makoto) has the most reigns at two times, while individually, Arisa Nakajima has the most reigns at four times. As a team, Hiroyo Matsumoto and Yoshiko has the lognest reign at 463 days, while Nakajima and Sae has the shortest at 39 days. Nanae Takahashi is the oldest champion at 42 years old, while Asuka is the youngest at 22 years old.

Las Fresa de Egoistas are the current champions in their second reign. They defeated the team of Hiroyo Matsumoto and Takahashi on December 29, 2021 at Seadlinnng 2021 Final Battle.

Combined reigns

By team 

{| class="wikitable sortable" style="text-align: center"
!Rank
!Team
!No. ofreigns
!Combineddefenses
!Combineddays
|-
!1
|style="background-color: #ffe6bd"| † || 2 || 5 || +
|-
!2
| and Yoshiko || 1 || 5 || 463
|-
!3
| || 1 || 4 || 141
|-
!4
| and Nanae Takahashi || 1 || 1 || 124
|-
!5
| and Nanae Takahashi || 1 || 0 || 98
|-
!6
| and Ayame Sasamura || 1 || 1 || 77
|-
!7
| || 1 || 1 || 61
|-
!8
| and Yoshiko || 1 || 1 || 56
|-
!9
| || 1 || 1 || 55
|-
!10
| and Sae || 1 || 0 || 39
|-

By wrestler

References

External links 
 Seadlinnng's official website
 Beyond the Sea Tag Team Championship history at seadlinnng.com

Women's professional wrestling tag team championships